Stewart Sloan is a British-born novelist and short story writer.  He is the author of The Sorceress (Hong Kong Horrors, 1994); Isle of the Rat (Hong Kong Horrors, 1994); and co-author (with Rebecca Bradley) of Temutma (Asia 2000, Hong Kong, 1998).  Temutma has been published in a German translation (Unionsverlag, Zurich, 2000), and also adapted (without authorisation) into a radio play in German.  Sloan's fourth book, May The Force Be With You, was published in 2007.  It features a collection of anecdotes about the Hong Kong Police Force.

Sloan's fiction is broadly in the supernatural horror genre.  He has lived most of his life in Hong Kong, and his books reflect his extensive local knowledge of the territory.  He has also been English editor of the Asian Sport Divers' Journal.

Sloan worked for the Asian Human Rights Commission for ten years, an experience which has put him off NGOs for the rest of his life. He is semi-retired and spends most of his time writing and teaching creative writing. He continues to live in Hong Kong with his second wife, Airyn and two cats, Biscuit and Mollie.

References

Year of birth missing (living people)
Living people
Hong Kong writers
British emigrants to Hong Kong